Kamalapur or "Kamalapuram" may refer to:
 Kamalapur, Hanumakonda district in Telangana, India
Kamalapuram, Dindigul, a village in Dindigul district, Tamil Nadu, India
Kamalapuram, Kadapa, a village in Kadapa district, Andhra Pradesh, India
Kamalapuram, Khammam, a village in Khammam district, Telangana, India
Kamalapuram mandal, a mandal in Kadapa district, Andhra Pradesh, India
Kamalapuram, Warangal, a village in Warangal district, Andhra Pradesh, India
Kamalapura (also Kamalapuram), a town in Bellary district, Karnataka, India
Kotha Kamalapuram, a village in Khammam district of Telangana state, India.